Fermi Linux is the generic name for Linux distributions that are created and used at Fermi National Accelerator Laboratory (Fermilab). These releases have gone through different names: Fermi Linux, Fermi Linux LTS, LTS, Fermi Linux STS, STS, Scientific Linux Fermi, SLF.  For the purposes of this entry they can be used interchangeably to designate a version of Linux specific to Fermilab.

At the current time, the only officially supported Fermi Linux is Scientific Linux Fermi, which is based on Scientific Linux.

History
Fermi Linux started out as an extension of the PC Farms Pilot Project spearheaded by Connie Sieh.  A Fermilab initiative to seek out cost effective computing for the Tevatron.  Continuing to update the SGI and AIX hardware for the computing needs of that experiment was very expensive.

Initial builds of Fermi Linux were merely Red Hat Linux with some things turned off or some extra packages added.  With the release of Scientific Linux, Fermi Linux became a 'site' specific build of Scientific Linux.

Releases

Support policy
Fermi Linux follows the Scientific Linux life cycle regarding support and updates.

There is a vibrant Linux community at Fermilab.  This includes dedicated email lists and regular meetings provided by the Scientific Linux development team.

Fermi Linux LTS
Fermi Linux LTS is in essence Red Hat Enterprise Linux, recompiled.

Workers in Fermilab took the source code from Red Hat Enterprise Linux in srpm form and recompiled them resulting in binaries in rpm form with the only restrictions being the license from the original source code.  They are bundling these binaries into a Linux distribution that is as close to Red Hat Enterprise Linux as they can get.  The goal is to ensure that if a program runs and is certified on Red Hat Enterprise Linux, then it will run on the corresponding Fermi Linux release.

See also

Fermi National Accelerator Laboratory (Fermilab)
Scientific Linux
Linux
Red Hat Linux
Red Hat Enterprise Linux (RHEL), commercial Linux distribution on which Fermi Linux is based
CentOS, another Linux distribution based on Red Hat Enterprise Linux

External links

References

Fermilab
RPM-based Linux distributions
X86-64 Linux distributions
Linux distributions